Richard M. Hazelett House, also known as Sunny Hill, is a historic home located at Greencastle, Putnam County, Indiana. It was built in 1868, and is a two-story, Italianate style brick dwelling.  It has a slate cross-hipped roof and sits on a raised stone foundation. The house features tall arched double hung windows with decorative caps and a wraparound verandah.  Also on the property are the contributing combination smokehouse / privy, barn, and wrought iron fence.

It was listed on the National Register of Historic Places in 2006.

References

Houses on the National Register of Historic Places in Indiana
Italianate architecture in Indiana
Houses completed in 1868
Buildings and structures in Putnam County, Indiana
National Register of Historic Places in Putnam County, Indiana